Crabill is a surname, derived from the German Krähenbühl.

Notable people with the name Crabill include:
A. J. Crabill (born 1979), American education reform advocate 
Norman L. Crabill (born 1930), American NASA engineer (retired)

References